CiN Weekly was a free weekly culture newspaper in Cincinnati, Ohio operated by The Cincinnati Enquirer.  It was established in 2003, and in July 2009 the paper was replaced by a Cincinnati version of Metromix.

References

External links
 Metromix Cincinnati

Defunct newspapers published in Cincinnati
Weekly newspapers published in the United States
Publications established in 2003
Publications disestablished in 2009
Gannett publications
2003 establishments in Ohio
2009 disestablishments in Ohio
The Cincinnati Enquirer
Defunct weekly newspapers